Edwin M. and Emily S. Johnston House is a historic home located at Buffalo in Erie County, New York.  It is a Colonial Revival style brick dwelling designed by Bley & Lyman in 1934.  It consists of a -story cross-gabled main block with a 2-story side-gabled garage wing.

It was listed on the National Register of Historic Places in 1997.  It is located in the Elmwood Historic District–East.

References

External links
Edwin M. and Emily S. Johnston House - U.S. National Register of Historic Places on Waymarking.com

Houses on the National Register of Historic Places in New York (state)
Colonial Revival architecture in New York (state)
Houses completed in 1934
Houses in Buffalo, New York
National Register of Historic Places in Buffalo, New York
Historic district contributing properties in Erie County, New York
1934 establishments in New York (state)